Bryan Jerome Hoeing (born October 19, 1996) is an American professional baseball pitcher in the Miami Marlins organization.

Amateur career
Hoeing attended Batesville High School in Batesville, Indiana, where he played baseball and basketball. He was selected by the Arizona Diamondbacks in the 32nd round of the 2015 Major League Baseball draft, but he did not sign and instead enrolled at the University of Louisville to play college baseball. In 2017 and 2018, he played collegiate summer baseball with the Bourne Braves of the Cape Cod Baseball League. After his junior year in 2018, he was drafted by the San Francisco Giants in the 36th round of the 2018 Major League Baseball draft but did not sign. As a senior in 2019, he appeared in 22 games and went 3-4 with a 3.00 ERA over 63 innings. After the season, he was selected by the Miami Marlins in the seventh round of the 2019 Major League Baseball draft.

Professional career
Hoeing signed with the Marlins and made his professional debut with the Batavia Muckdogs, going 0-2 with a 4.43 ERA over  innings. He did not play a game in 2020 due to the cancellation of the minor league season. In 2021, he played with the Beloit Snappers with whom he started 22 games and went 7-6 with a 4.83 ERA and 96 strikeouts over 121 innings. He opened the 2022 season with the Pensacola Blue Wahoos and was promoted to the Jacksonville Jumbo Shrimp in early May.

On August 20, 2022, the Marlins selected Hoeing's contract and promoted him to the major leagues to make his MLB debut that night as the starting pitcher versus the Los Angeles Dodgers at Dodger Stadium. He pitched three innings in which he gave up seven earned runs on eight hits (two home runs), one walk, and two strikeouts as the Marlins fell 7-0. He was outrighted off the roster on November 9, 2022.

Personal life
Hoeing's cousin, Alex Meyer, played in MLB.

References

External links

Louisville Cardinals bio

1996 births
Living people
Baseball players from Indiana
Batavia Muckdogs players
Beloit Snappers players
Bourne Braves players
Jacksonville Jumbo Shrimp players
Louisville Cardinals baseball players
Major League Baseball pitchers
Miami Marlins players
Pensacola Blue Wahoos players
People from Batesville, Indiana